Oregon County is a county located in the southern portion of the U.S. state of Missouri. As of the 2020 census, the population was 8,635. Its county seat is Alton. The county was officially organized on February 14, 1845, and was named for the Oregon Territory in the northwestern United States.

Home to a large area of the Mark Twain National Forest, Oregon County contains more national forest acreage than any county in the state of Missouri. It also contains the Irish Wilderness, the largest federally protected wilderness area in the state. Hiking, backpacking, and horseback riding opportunities abound on the Ozark Trail and the White's Creek Trail. Canoeing, kayaking, jonboating, and fishing are popular on the Eleven Point River, which is Missouri's only National Wild and Scenic River.

Eleven Point State Park is under development east of Alton, Missouri that includes 6 miles of Eleven Point River frontage.

Grand Gulf State Park, just west of Thayer, includes a karst window, a collapsed karst canyon.

History
Oregon County was created in 1845, at a time when the Oregon boundary dispute was a major issue.

Geography
Arkansas is located to the south of Oregon County.

Adjacent counties
Shannon County (north)
Carter County (northeast)
Ripley County (east)
Randolph County, Arkansas (southeast)
Sharp County, Arkansas (south)
Fulton County, Arkansas (southwest)
Howell County (west)

Major highways
 U.S. Route 63
 U.S. Route 160
 Route 19
 Route 99
 Route 142

National protected area
Mark Twain National Forest (part)

Demographics

As of the census of 2000, there were 10,344 people, 4,263 households, and 3,018 families residing in the county. The population density was 13 people per square mile (5/km2).  There were 4,997 housing units at an average density of 6 per square mile (2/km2). The racial makeup of the county was 94.61% White, 0.10% Black or African American, 2.88% Native American, 0.14% Asian, 0.01% Pacific Islander, 0.08% from other races, and 2.19% from two or more races. Approximately 1.09% of the population were Hispanic or Latino of any race. Among the major first ancestries reported in Oregon County were 29.7% American, 13.4% English, 13.1% Irish, and 13.0% German.

There were 4,263 households, out of which 29.30% had children under the age of 18 living with them, 58.80% were married couples living together, 8.40% had a female householder with no husband present, and 29.20% were non-families. 26.20% of all households were made up of individuals, and 13.90% had someone living alone who was 65 years of age or older. The average household size was 2.40 and the average family size was 2.86.

In the county, the population was spread out, with 24.30% under the age of 18, 7.00% from 18 to 24, 24.10% from 25 to 44, 26.50% from 45 to 64, and 18.00% who were 65 years of age or older. The median age was 41 years. For every 100 females there were 96.40 males. For every 100 women age 18 and over, there were 92.80 men.

The median income for a household in the county was $26,119, and the median income for a family was $31,637. Males had a median income of $22,304 versus $16,353 for females. The per capita income for the county was $15,043. About 16.30% of families and 22.00% of the population were below the poverty line, including 28.20% of those under age 18 and 20.00% of those age 65 or over. Of the state's 115 counties, in 2010 Oregon ranked last in terms of poverty.

Religion
According to the Association of Religion Data Archives County Membership Report (2010), Oregon County is a part of the Bible Belt with evangelical Protestantism being the majority religion. The most predominant denominations among residents in Oregon County who adhere to a religion are Southern Baptists (46.0%), National Association of Free Will Baptists (30.1%), and Churches of Christ (9.1%).

2020 Census

Politics

Local

Political control at the county level is currently divided between the Democratic and Republican parties.

State
All of Oregon County is a part of the 143rd District in the Missouri House of Representatives and is currently represented by Jeffrey Pogue (R-Salem).

All of Oregon County is a part of Missouri's 33rd District in the Missouri Senate and is currently represented by Mike Cunningham (R-Rogersville).

Federal

Oregon County is included in Missouri's 8th Congressional District and is currently represented by Jason T. Smith (R-Salem) in the U.S. House of Representatives. Smith won a special election on Tuesday, June 4, 2013, to finish out the remaining term of U.S. Representative Jo Ann Emerson (R-Cape Girardeau). Emerson announced her resignation a month after being reelected with over 70 percent of the vote in the district. She resigned to become CEO of the National Rural Electric Cooperative.

Political culture

At the presidential level, Oregon County was solidly Democratic from its founding in 1845 through 1996; in 1960, Richard Nixon became the first Republican ever to carry the county, but, aside from Nixon's landslide over McGovern in 1972, it would not go Republican again until 2000, when it voted for George W. Bush. It voted Republican again in the next two elections, 2004 and 2008, although the Republican vote share shrank slightly in both elections. In 2012, Mitt Romney became the first Republican since 1972 to break 60% in the county; in 2016, Donald Trump became the first Republican to exceed 70%; and in 2020, Trump became the first Republican to exceed 80%. The county has voted Republican for six elections straight as of 2020.

Like most rural areas throughout Southeast Missouri, voters in Oregon County generally adhere to socially and culturally conservative principles. In 2004, Missourians voted on a constitutional amendment to define marriage as the union between a man and a woman—it overwhelmingly passed Oregon County with 87.09 percent of the vote. The initiative passed the state with 71 percent of support from voters as Missouri became the first state to ban same-sex marriage. In 2006, Missourians voted on a constitutional amendment to fund and legalize embryonic stem cell research in the state—it failed in Oregon County with 56.78 percent voting against the measure. The initiative narrowly passed the state with 51 percent of support from voters as Missouri became one of the first states in the nation to approve embryonic stem cell research. Despite Oregon County's longstanding tradition of supporting socially conservative platforms, voters in the county have a penchant for advancing populist causes like increasing the minimum wage. In 2006, Missourians voted on a proposition (Proposition B) to increase the minimum wage in the state to $6.50 an hour—it passed Oregon County with 73.14 percent of the vote. The proposition strongly passed every single county in Missouri with 75.94 percent voting in favor as the minimum wage was increased to $6.50 an hour in the state. During the same election, voters in five other states also strongly approved increases in the minimum wage.

Missouri presidential preference primary (2008)

In the 2008 presidential primary, voters in Oregon County from both political parties supported candidates who finished in second place in the state at large and nationally. Former U.S. Senator Hillary Clinton (D-New York) received more votes, a total of 989, than any candidate from either party in Oregon County during the 2008 presidential primary.

Education
Of adults 25 years of age and older in Oregon County, 72.0% possesses a high school diploma or higher while 9.1% holds a bachelor's degree or higher as their highest educational attainment.

Public schools
Alton R-IV School District - Alton
Alton Elementary School (K-06)
Alton High School (07-12)
Couch R-I School District - Myrtle
Couch Elementary School (K-06)
Couch High School (07-12)
Oregon-Howell R-III School District - Koshkonong
Koshkonong Elementary School (K-06)
Koshkonong High School (07-12)
Thayer R-II School District - Thayer
Thayer Elementary School (K-06)
Thayer High School (07-12)

Public libraries
 Oregon County Library District

Communities

Cities
 Alton (county seat)
 Koshkonong
 Thayer

Census-designated place
 Thomasville

Other unincorporated places

 Bardley
 Billmore
 Braswell
 Brawley
 Calm
 Clifton
 Corona
 Couch
 Deckard-Y
 Farewell
 Garfield
 Greer
 Griswold
 Guiteau
 Hollis
 Huddleston
 Jeff
 Jobe
 Lulu
 Many Springs
 Midway
 Myrtle
 Rover
 Royal Oak
 Wilderness
 Woodside

See also
 National Register of Historic Places listings in Oregon County, Missouri

References

External links
 Digitized 1930 Plat Book of Oregon County  from University of Missouri Division of Special Collections, Archives, and Rare Books
 Geologic Map of the Piedmont Hollow Quadrangle, Oregon County, Missouri United States Geological Survey
 
 Oregon County Sheriff's Office

 
1845 establishments in Missouri
Populated places established in 1845